The 2009–10 Libyan Premier League (known as the Libyana Premier League for sponsorship reasons) is the forty-second edition of the competition since its establishment in 1963. A total of 14 clubs contested the league, with Ittihad Tripoli the defending champions.

This has been reduced from the system of 16 teams that had been in place since the 2007–08 season. The season was scheduled to begin on 1 October 2009, but was later postponed until 8 October 2009. The season was scheduled to finish on 14 May 2010. However, this was later delayed to 1 June due to CAF fixtures and national team commitments.

The fixture list was released on 4 September 2009.

The league paused for its mid-season break on 13 January 2010 and continued on 28 January 2010. 

There was another break after Round 16 (19 February – 22 March), due to the national team's fixtures, and CAF competition. Next season, the league will be reduced again and this time to 12 teams.

Summary
Ittihad secured their 16th top flight title with three games to spare after a 2–0 home win over Najma on 18 May 2010. This was their sixth league title in succession and their eighth in the last nine seasons.

Ahly Tripoli were expelled from the league and had their record for the second half of the season expunged on 17 May 2010. Having failed to show for two successive matches in protest at unfair treatment spanning a number of years from the Libyan Football Federation, which was sparked by their 1–2 home defeat to bitter rivals Ittihad, they vowed not to compete in competitions run by the LFF. As a result, they were relegated to the Libyan Second Division, meaning each side would now play only 25 games. Tahaddy became the second side to be relegated on 22 May, after Shat, Olomby, Sweahly and Najma all won their respective matches on that day. Due to their inferior head-to-head record, even a victory against Shat on the final day would not have seen them avoid the drop. Their relegation was confirmed after their 3–1 win over Hilal was awarded 2–0 to Hilal after it was discovered Tahaddy had played a suspended player.

In one of the tightest relegation battles in recent history, Sweahly, Olomby, Shat and Najma all started the final round of fixtures within two points of each other, and all facing the danger of the drop. Sweahly hosted Ittihad, Shat were at home to already relegated Tahaddy, Najma travelled to Tersanah, who had secured their safety the previous week, and Olomby faced Nasr at Zaawia Stadium. Olomby went behind early on to Salem al Rewani's spot kick, before equalising on 31 minutes through Aymen Rhifi and Najma took the lead on the half-hour through Chakib Lachkhem's penalty. Sweahly went in front against a much weakened Ittihad side through ex-Ittihad defender Keba Paul Koulibaly's penalty on 43 minutes. At the break, it was Olomby who would be relegated. Shat scored two goals in the first two minutes of the second period against Tahaddy, and added a further two goals for a comfortable 4–0 victory. Najma held on against a lacklustre Tersanah side, meaning they needed Nasr to hold Olomby to face a relegation playoff. Sweahly faced a scare when Saami al Ghoula equalised on 72 minutes, but Tunisian forward Jemail Khemir put them back in front three minutes later, ensuring their survival. With time running out, Rhifi netted on 82 minutes to send the Second Division champions down. Olomby now face a two-legged playoff against Wahda for a place in next season's Premier League.

Teams
As the league reduced in size from 16 to 14 teams, four teams were relegated from last season's competition. These four teams were Aman al Aam, Wefaq Sabratha, Jazeera and Wahda Tripoli. Newly promoted Aman al Aam lasted just one season, though a spirited fightback towards the end of the season meant that their fate was sealed only on the final day, when Hilal got the point they needed to survive. Wefaq Sabratha, another of the newly promoted clubs, were relegated despite a decent start to season. However, a 15-game winless run left them languishing in the relegation zone, and they failed to recover. Jazeera ended their two-year stint in the top flight with a poor showing, losing 20 of their 30 games, and despite a decent run of form towards the back end of the season, it was too little too late. Wahda were rooted to the bottom of the table for the whole season, and did not win a game until a 2–1 away victory at Al Shat in mid-May. Their return of 11 points from 30 games one of the worst in Libyan history.

Only two clubs were promoted from the Libyan Second Division; Najma finished as champions (see Libyan Second Division 2008-09 - Championship Stage), while Tahaddy secured their return to the top flight after a one-year absence.

Stadia & Locations

League table

Positions by round
NB: Note: The classification was made after the weekend of each matchday, so postponed matches were only processed at the time they were played to represent the real evolution in standings. These postponed matches are:

Ahly Benghazi 2–0 Tahaddy (Round 9) (played between 9th and 10th matchdays)
Sweahly 0–1 Ahly Benghazi (Round 10) (played on 11th matchday)
Akhdar 1–1 Sweahly (Round 11) (played between 11th and 12th matchdays)
Ahly Benghazi 5–0 Tersanah (Round 11) (played between 11th and 12th matchdays)
Tersanah 0–1 Khaleej Sirte (Round 16) (played between 16th and 17th matchdays)
Ahly Tripoli 2–1 Olomby (Round 16) (played between 16th and 17th matchdays)
Hilal 2–2 Madina (Round 16) (played between 16th and 17th matchdays)
Ittihad 3–1 Ahly Benghazi (Round 16) (played between 16th and 17th matchdays)
Khaleej Sirte 1–1 Ahly Benghazi (Round 20) (played between 20th and 21st matchdays)
Nasr 3–3 Tahaddy (Round 20) (played between 20th and 21st matchdays)
Madina 0–1 Najma (played between 20th and 21st matchdays)

Results
Ahly Tripoli's record for the second half of the season was expunged by the Libyan Football Federation on 17 May, leaving the results from their first 13 games intact.

Relegation playoff
The second-placed team in the Libyan Second Division Promotion Stage, Wahda, faced a two-legged play-off match against the 11th placed team in the Premier League, Olomby for a place in the Premier League next season. The draw was made on 2 June. The matches took place on 5 and 9 June, with Olomby winning 3–1 on aggregate and retaining their place in the top flight for next season.

Olomby won 3–1 on aggregate

Season statistics

Top Scorers 
Updated 28 April 2010

Overall
 Most wins – Ittihad (15)
 Fewest wins – Tahaddy (4)
 Most losses - Tahaddy (16)
 Fewest losses - Ittihad and Madina (4)
 Most goals scored – Khaleej Sirte (47)
 Fewest goals scored – Tahaddy (21)
 Most goals conceded – Tahaddy (49)
 Fewest goals conceded – Ittihad, Ahly Benghazi & Madina (27)
 Best goal difference – Ittihad (+18)
 Worst goal difference – Tahaddy (−28)

Home
 Most wins − Ittihad (9)
 Fewest wins − Tahaddy (0)
 Most losses − Tahahddy (9)
 Fewest losses − Akhdar (1)
 Most goals scored − Ittihad (29)
 Fewest goals scored − Tahaddy (8)
 Most goals conceded − Tahaddy (23)
 Fewest goals conceded − Madina (9)

Away
 Most wins − Ahly Benghazi (7)
 Fewest wins − Akhdar (1)
 Most losses − Nasr (8)
 Fewest losses − Ittihad & Madina (2)
 Most goals scored − Ahly Benghazi & Tersanah (20)
 Fewest goals scored − Akhdar (7)
 Most goals conceded − Tersanah (26)
 Fewest goals conceded − Ittihad (11)

Clean Sheets
 Most clean sheets − Ittihad (10)
 Fewest clean sheets − Tahaddy (3)

Scoring
 First goal of the season: Mohammad Zirqi for Khaleej Sirte against Tahaddy, 18th minute (8 October 2009)
 Last goal of the season: Aymen Rhifi for Olomby against Nasr, 82nd minute (1 June 2010)
 First penalty kick of the season : Mohammad al Mabrouk (scored) for Tahaddy, 60th minute (8 October 2009)
 First own goal of the season : Ali Salama (Ahly Benghazi) for Nasr, 58 minutes and 37 seconds (29 October 2009)
 Fastest goal in a match: 9 seconds - Ahmed al Mezoughi (o.g.) for Ahly Benghazi against Olomby (27 May 2010)
 Goal scored at latest point in a match: 90+6 minutes and 58 seconds: Sheikh Sedao for Khaleej Sirte against Akhdar (10 December 2009)
 Widest winning margin: 5 goals:
 Ahly Benghazi 5–0 Tersanah (29 December 2009)
 Most goals in a match: 7 goals:
Najma 4–3 Olomby (8 April 2010)
Najma 2–5 Ahly Benghazi (27 April 2010)
 Most goals in one half: 5 goals:
Najma Benghazi 2–5 Ahly Benghazi (2–3 at half time) (27 April 2010)
 Most goals in one half by a single team: 4 goals:
Shat 0–4 Khaleej Sirte (0–0 at half time) (7 April 2010)
 Most goals scored by losing team: 3 goals
Najma 4–3 Olomby (8 April 2010)
 Most goals scored in a match by a single player: 2 goals, occurred on 12 occasions
 Shortest time between goals: 1 minute 14 seconds: Omar Dawood (Ahly Tripoli) (31'50"), Mohammad al Tijani (Ahly Tripoli) (33'04") - Khaleej Sirte 2–2 Ahly Tripoli (13 January 2010)

Discipline
 First red card of the season : Achour Majeed (Khaleej Sirte) against Tahaddy, 59th minute (8 October 2009)
 Most yellow cards in one match : 11 – Ahly Benghazi 2–1 Nasr – 5 for Ahly Benghazi (Akram Ayyad, Adil al Sha'iri, Moataz Ben Amer, Waleed al Dirsi & Ahmed al Masli) and 6 for Nasr (Alaa al Oujli, Abdelhakeem al Mahdi, Marei Al Ramly, Salem al Rewani, Snousi Imbarek & Muaad Aboud) (29 October 2009)

Continental Competitions

2009 North African Cup Winners Cup 
Semi-finals
 FAR Rabat - Ahly Benghazi W (0–0, 0–1) 1–0 on aggregate

Final
Ahly Benghazi L - CS Sfaxien (a)   (1–1, 0–0 ) 1–1 on aggregate

2009 North African Cup of Champions
Semi-finals
 ES Tunis - Ittihad Tripoli L (2–1, 2–2) 4–3 on aggregate

2010 CAF Champions League
Preliminary round
 Djoliba AC – Ahly Benghazi L (1–0, 0–0 ),  1–0 on aggregate
 AS Tempête Mocaf – Ittihad (1–2, 0–6)  1–8 on aggregate
First round
Ittihad -  Difaa El Jadida (1–1, 1–1 2–2 on aggregate, Ittihad won 4–3 on penalties
Second round
Ittihad L -  Al Ahly (2–0, 0–3 ) 2–3 on aggregate

2010 CAF Confederation Cup
Preliminary round
 AS CotonTchad – Ahly Tripoli (0–0, 0–2) 0–2 on aggregate
Tersanah L –  CR Belouizdad (1–1, 1–2) 2–3 on aggregate
First round
Ahly Tripoli L -  CS Sfaxien (0–0, 0–1) 0–1 on aggregate

See also
2008–09 Libyan Premier League
2008–09 Libyan Second Division (Championship Stage)

References
NB: Registration required for access to archived articles at kooora.com

External links
Libyan Football Federation for information, results and fixtures 
goalzz.com
super.ae

2009-10 Libyan Premier League
1
Lib